South Wales Miners' Federation v Glamorgan Coal Co. [1905] AC 239 is an old UK labour law case, and part of an infamous three tort cases that imposed liability on trade unions for going on strike.

Facts

Coal prices were constantly declining. Respondent in the interest of labourers forced them to leave the job and join after the prices of coal hike up again. Plaintiff filed suit in a court of law.

Judgment
The House of Lords held that it was no defence to an action for inducing breach of contract that the conduct of the defendants was dictated by an honest desire to promote the interests of trade union members and not to injure the employer.

Overturning
Trade Disputes Act 1906
Crofter Hand Woven Harris Tweed v Veitch [1942] AC 435 right to take part in collective bargaining by Lord Wright
Wilson and Palmer v United Kingdom [2002] ECHR, right to take action in defence of union members interests follows from the freedom of association in Art.11 ECHR

See also
Taff Vale Railway Co v Amalgamated Society of Railway Servants [1901] AC 426
Quinn v Leatham

United Kingdom labour case law
House of Lords cases
1905 in case law
1905 in British law
United Kingdom trade union case law